Karen Valerie Briggs (married name Karen Inman) MBE (born 11 April 1963) is a retired British judoka. Internationally active throughout the 1980's and 1990's, Briggs was a multiple World (four-time) and European (five-time) champion, represented Great Britain at the 1992 Olympic Games, and won gold for England at the 1990 Commonwealth Games. She is a member of the IJF Hall of Fame, and recognised as one of the most successful British and female judoka of all time.

Judo career
Briggs came to significant prominence after winning the gold medal at the 1982 World Judo Championships in the under 48kg category. She went on to be world champion on four occasions winning five World Championship gold medals in her weight category at the 1984 World Judo Championships, in Vienna, the 1986 World Judo Championships, in Maastricht and the 1989 World Judo Championships, in Belgrade.

From 1982 to 1987 she was European champion five times after taking the gold medal at the European Judo Championships. In 1986, she won the gold medal in the 48kg weight category at the judo demonstration sport event as part of the 1986 Commonwealth Games.

In 1990, she represented England and won a gold medal in the 48 kg extra-lightweight, at the 1990 Commonwealth Games in Auckland, New Zealand.

In 1992, she represented Great Britain at the 1992 Summer Olympics, this was the first time women's judo was included as an official Olympic sport (the first was as a demonstration event in 1988). She placed fifth after suffering a dislocated shoulder in the women's 48kg category.

In addition to her multiple international titles, she won the bantamweight division at the British Judo Championships in 1981, 1983, 1984 and 1991.

Awards
In August 2015 Briggs was inducted into the IJF hall of fame

Personal life
She is married to Peter Inman, son of Olympic judo coach Roy Inman, and now teaches judo at schools in East Yorkshire. On 9 July 2013 the University of Hull granted to Karen the award of Doctor of the University, honoris causa.

References

External links
 

Olympic judoka of Great Britain
Living people
1963 births
Sportspeople from Kingston upon Hull
Judoka at the 1992 Summer Olympics
Members of the Order of the British Empire
English female judoka
Judoka at the 1990 Commonwealth Games
Commonwealth Games medallists in judo
Commonwealth Games gold medallists for England
Medallists at the 1990 Commonwealth Games